The 1966 NBA draft was the 20th annual draft of the National Basketball Association (NBA). The draft was held on May 11 and 12, 1966 before the 1966–67 season. In this draft, ten NBA teams took turns selecting amateur U.S. college basketball players. A player who had finished his four-year college eligibility was eligible for selection. If a player left college early, he would not be eligible for selection until his college class graduated. The first two picks in the draft belonged to the teams that finished last in each division, with the order determined by a coin flip. The New York Knicks won the coin flip and were awarded the first overall pick, while the Detroit Pistons were awarded the second pick. This draft was the first to use the coin flip method, which replaced the territorial pick rule. The remaining first-round picks and the subsequent rounds were assigned to teams in reverse order of their win–loss record in the previous season. An expansion franchise, the Chicago Bulls, took part in the NBA Draft for the first time and were assigned the last pick of each round. The draft consisted of 19 rounds comprising 112 players selected.

With the elimination of territorial picks and incorporation of a coin flip for the No. 1 overall pick, 1966 is considered the first modern NBA draft.

Draft selections and draftee career notes
Cazzie Russell from the University of Michigan was selected first overall by the New York Knicks. Dave Bing from Syracuse University, who went on to win the Rookie of the Year Award in his first season, was drafted second by the Detroit Pistons. He was named in the 50 Greatest Players in NBA History list announced at the league's 50th anniversary in 1996 and has also been inducted to the Basketball Hall of Fame. He was selected to three All-NBA Teams and seven All-Star Games. He became a politician after ending his playing career and won the election to become the mayor of Detroit in 2009.

Russell won the NBA championship with the New York Knicks 1970. He later was named to the All-Star Game in 1972. Lou Hudson, the 4th pick, and Archie Clark, the 37th pick, have also been selected to both All-NBA Team and All-Star Game. Hudson was selected to six All-Star Games and one All-NBA Team while Clark was selected to two All-Star Games and one All-NBA Team. Three other players from this draft, 3rd pick Clyde Lee, 5th pick Jack Marin and 27th pick John Block, have also been selected to at least one All-Star Game. Matt Guokas, the 9th pick, won the NBA championship with the Philadelphia 76ers in his rookie season. He and his father, Matt Guokas, Sr., became the first father and son duo to win the NBA championships. Matt Guokas, Sr. won the inaugural championship with the Philadelphia Warriors in 1947. The younger Guokas became a head coach after ending his playing career. He coached the 76ers for three seasons and the Orlando Magic for four seasons. John Wetzel, the 75th pick, also became a head coach; he coached the Phoenix Suns for one season.

Key

Draft

Other picks
The following list includes other draft picks who have appeared in at least one NBA game.

Notable undrafted players
These players were not selected in the 1966 draft but played at least one game in the NBA.

See also
 List of first overall NBA draft picks

References
General

Specific

External links
NBA.com
NBA.com: NBA Draft History

Draft
National Basketball Association draft
NBA draft
NBA draft
Basketball in New York City
Sporting events in New York City